Henri Marescaux (12 September 1943 – 1 April 2021) was a French army general and Roman Catholic deacon.

Biography
Marescaux studied at the École Polytechnique from 1963 to 1965 and joined the French Army in 1965, achieving the rank of second lieutenant in 1965, lieutenant in 1966, captain 1970, battalion commander in 1977, lieutenant-colonel in 1981, colonel in 1985, brigadier general in 1992, division general in 1995, army corps general in 1998, and army general in 2001.

He then directed the  Besançon. From 1993 to 1997, he was Director General of the École Polytechnique. After spending time with the Direction générale de l'armement, he became an Army General in 1999.

In 2004, Marescaux was ordained a deacon with the Diocese of Versailles by Bishop Éric Aumonier, devoting himself to the service of prostitutes. He assisted in getting several hundred of them out of sex work, offering French classes to foreigners and tutoring them in their courses. In 2019, he published a book on his experiences, titled Les prostituées nous précèdent.

Henri Marescaux died in Le Chesnay on 1 April 2021 at the age of 77.

References

1943 births
2021 deaths
French generals
Roman Catholic deacons
École Polytechnique alumni
People from Albertville